Costantino della Gherardesca Verecondi Scortecci (born 29 January 1977, in Rome), or simply Costantino della Gherardesca, is an Italian actor, journalist, radio presenter, television personality and presenter.

Gherardesca is part of a notable aristocratic family and graduated in philosophy from King's College London, and entered show business at the start of the 2000s. Along with Giorgio Bozzo of P-Nuts he is best known for his participation as a commentator in television shows conducted by Piero Chiambretti, and currently presents Pechino Express and Boss in incognito for RAI and Discovery. Scortecci is the descendant of Count Ugolino della Gherardesca.

He is gay and interested in the preservation of the environment.

Television

References

External links

Scheda sul sito P-NUTS 
Intervista a La Repubblica sul sito "In Gran Forma" 
Intervista a TVBlog 

21st-century Italian male actors
Italian LGBT journalists
Italian male journalists
Italian male television actors
Italian radio presenters
Italian LGBT broadcasters
1977 births
Male actors from Rome
Living people
Alumni of King's College London
Italian gay actors
Italian environmentalists
21st-century LGBT people